On 23 October 2005, Brazil held a country-wide referendum on article 35 of the Disarmament Statute to determine whether to approve or disapprove the article, which states in full, "The sale of firearms and ammunition is prohibited in the entire national territory, except to those entities provided in article 6 of this Law." ("Art. 35. É proibida a comercialização de arma de fogo e munição em todo o território nacional, salvo para as entidades previstas no art. 6o desta Lei.") The referendum failed by nearly ⅔ and that part of the statute was not enacted.

The referendum and its date had been provided by the Disarmament Statute itself (art. 35, §1o). During the drafting and development of the law, it had been decided that article 35 should be submitted to a referendum because of the importance of its subject. On 7 July 2005, the Federal Senate of Brazil promulgated legislative decree 780, which authorized the referendum. Article 2 of its decree stipulated that the public consultation should employ the following question: "Should commerce in firearms and ammunition be prohibited in Brazil?" ("O comércio de armas de fogo e munição deve ser proibido no Brasil?")

Background
Voting was compulsory for people between the ages of 18 and 70. The belief of a fundamental natural human right to self-defense, low efficacy of police, high levels of use of illegal weapons in crimes in contrast to a very rare usage of legal weapons, are some of the factors that may have influenced 65% of Brazilian people to vote against the ban proposal. The gun ban proposal received broad support in the press, while celebrities were generally in favor of it, only Brazil's anti-ban social groups and right-wing press, most importantly Veja the Brazilian news magazine (indeed weekly publication of any kind) with the largest paid circulation in the country. Other media, like the powerful Globo group (owners of Brazil's largest TV network Rede Globo) and newspapers of record like Folha de S.Paulo advocated clearly pro gun ban. The then President Lula was a self-declared pro gun ban power.

According to the Brazilian constitution, every citizen has the right to self-defense and the pro-gun campaigners focused their arguments on this constitutional right, as well as making economic arguments.

A decisive argument made by the pro-gun campaigners was to question the morality of the government removing a right from its citizens, resulting in a strong feeling among voters that no rights should ever be allowed to be taken away by the government. Also, there were debates about the significant cultural status of gun ownership in the southern states of the country.

Another major argument used by the pro-gun ownership campaigners was the fact that the absolute majority of the gun crimes in Brazil were committed with unregistered and illegal guns, specially high caliber guns, that were already forbidden in Brazil and due to that, it would be of no use to forbid law-abiding citizens to own legal registered guns in accordance to the law. This argument was strongly reinforced by the fact that the regions where gun ownership is widespread were the ones with the smallest number of gun-related deaths. In the South region where there is the highest number of legal guns per citizen only 59% of all murders were caused by firearms in contrast to 70% in the Northeast where there is the lowest number of legal firearms per citizen.

The anti-gun proponents argued that guns are dangerous for society and that their only reason to exist is to harm others.

The anti-gun campaign received widespread support from several famous actors, musicians and other Brazilian celebrities and a noticeable support from the nation's main TV station, Rede Globo.

The ban had the backing of the federal government and sections of the Brazilian Roman Catholic Church. The anti-gun lobby received vast support and free coverage from the press, including Rede Globo, Brazil's largest TV network despite its parent company fairly neutral stance which eventually was reflected. By that time most Protestant-evangelical news organizations had taken a clearly anti-ban stance (including the Igreja Universal do Reino de Deus-owned Rede Record, Globo's main competitor at the time).

International support 
The IANSA member groups Instituto Sou da Paz and Viva Rio campaigned for a complete ban on civilian gun sales in Brazil, in support of the referendum.  A week before the vote, IANSA, an international gun control organization coordinated an international day of support for the Brazilian ban, with demonstrations taking place in Britain, Italy, South Africa, and other countries. IANSA urged support of the ban to "reinforce the movement in favor of gun control in other Latin American countries riddled with armed violence, and back the efforts to control private gun ownership at [an] international level."

Results
Although the federal government, the Catholic Church, and the United Nations argued in favor of the proposal, the result was a victory for those against the ban, with over 63% of the voters opposed.

By region

By state

See also
 Gun politics
 Gun politics in Brazil

Notes

References
 This article is based on material translated from the corresponding article in the Portuguese Wikipedia: :pt:Referendo sobre a proibição da comercialização de armas de fogo e munições.

External links
Information (in Portuguese)
 Resultado Oficial 
 Instruções e Resoluções do TSE
 Tire suas dúvidas sobre o Estatuto do Desarmamento
 Referendo Sobre o Desarmamento 
 Comunicação do Senado
 Pesquisa do Datafolha
 Lei que regulamenta a execução dos meios de soberania popular previstos no artigo 14 da Constituição Federal
Opinions against the referendum (in Portuguese)
 PSTU - Vote Não! Pelo direito à autodefesa dos trabalhadores!
 Referendo da Fumaça, Revista Veja, 05/10/05
 Portal Nosso São Paulo - Diga "não" à Mentira e à Hipocrisia
 A Farsa do Desarmamento
 Charges
Opinions in support of the referendum (in Portuguese)
 Especial Trip Desarmamento
 Pelo sim ao desarmamento - Comissão de Direitos Humanos e Minorias da Câmara dos Deputados - CDHM
 Sim ao desarmamento 
 Site Desarme

Referendums in Brazil
2005 referendums
Firearms and ammunition referendum
2005 elections in Brazil
Gun politics in Brazil
October 2005 events in South America